Abynotha is a genus of erebid moths in the subfamily Lymantriinae. The genus was first described in 1903 by Charles Swinhoe.

Species
The genus consists of the following species:
Abynotha meinickei Hering, 1926
Abynotha preussi (Mabille & Vuillot, 1892) - type species (as Liparis preussi).

References

Lymantriinae
Moth genera
Taxa named by Charles Swinhoe